The 1987–88 NHL season was the 71st season of the National Hockey League. It was an 80-game season with the top four teams in each division advancing to the Stanley Cup Playoffs. This season would see the Edmonton Oilers win their fourth Stanley Cup in five years by sweeping the Boston Bruins 4–0 in the Stanley Cup Final. In the process of their Cup win, Edmonton lost only two games, a record for the "16 wins" playoff format.

League business
The NHL introduced a new trophy, the King Clancy Memorial Trophy, which was to be awarded to the player who best exemplifies leadership qualities on and off the ice and who has made a significant humanitarian contribution in his community.

Regular season
This was Wayne Gretzky's final season with the Edmonton Oilers and, as injuries held him out of 20% of the season, this would be the only season of the decade in which he was not the winner of the Hart Memorial Trophy and the first season since 1979–80 that he did not hold or share the league lead in points. Mario Lemieux would capture his first Hart Trophy and lead the league in scoring.

On December 8, Ron Hextall of the Philadelphia Flyers became the first goalie to directly score a goal, shooting the puck into an empty net after their opponent had pulled their goalie for a sixth attacker.

On December 19, the St. Louis Blues and Boston Bruins combined to score two goals in two seconds. The Bruins were trailing 6-4 in the third period when Ken Linseman scored with 10 seconds remaining, followed by Blues center Doug Gilmour scoring off the resulting faceoff into an empty net.

The New Jersey Devils qualified for the playoffs for the first time, since their move from Denver in 1982.

Final standings

Prince of Wales Conference

Clarence Campbell Conference

Note: GP = Games played, W = Wins, L = Losses, T = Ties, Pts = Points, GF = Goals for, GA = Goals against
Note: Teams that qualified for the playoffs are highlighted in bold.

Playoffs

Playoff bracket

Stanley Cup Finals

Game four is well known for fog that interfered with the game, and a power outage that caused the game to be cancelled at 16:37 of the second period with the score tied 3–3.

When the Oilers won the replayed game four, they started the tradition in which the champs gather around with the Cup in a team photo.

NHL disregards stats from May 24 incomplete game.

Awards

All-Star teams

Player statistics

Scoring leaders

Note: GP = Games played; G = Goals; A = Assists; Pts = Points, PIM = Penalties in minutes, PPG = Powerplay Goals, SHG = Shorthanded Goals, GWG = Game Winning Goals

Source: NHL.

Leading goaltenders
GP = Games played; Min = Minutes played; W = Wins; L = Losses; T = Ties; SO = Shutouts; GAA = Goals against average; Sv% = Save percentage

Source: Quanthockey.com

Coaches

Patrick Division
New Jersey Devils: Doug Carpenter and Jim Schoenfeld
New York Islanders: Terry Simpson
New York Rangers: Michel Bergeron
Philadelphia Flyers: Mike Keenan and Paul Holmgren
Pittsburgh Penguins: Pierre Creamer
Washington Capitals: Bryan Murray

Adams Division
Boston Bruins: Terry O'Reilly
Buffalo Sabres: Ted Sator
Hartford Whalers: Jack Evans
Montreal Canadiens: Jean Perron
Quebec Nordiques: Andre Savard and Ron Lapointe

Norris Division
Chicago Blackhawks: Bob Murdoch
Detroit Red Wings: Jacques Demers
Minnesota North Stars: Herb Brooks
St. Louis Blues: Jacques Martin
Toronto Maple Leafs: John Brophy

Smythe Division
Calgary Flames: Terry Crisp
Edmonton Oilers: Glen Sather
Los Angeles Kings: Robbie Ftorek
Vancouver Canucks: Bob McCammon
Winnipeg Jets: Dan Maloney

Milestones

Debuts
The following is a list of players of note who played their first NHL game in 1987–88:
Tommy Albelin, Quebec Nordiques
Rob Brown, Pittsburgh Penguins
Sean Burke, New Jersey Devils
Adam Graves, Detroit Red Wings
Jiri Hrdina, Calgary Flames
Craig Janney, Boston Bruins
Calle Johansson, Buffalo Sabres
Brian Leetch, New York Rangers
Jeff Norton, New York Islanders
Luke Richardson, Toronto Maple Leafs
Mathieu Schneider, Montreal Canadiens
Brendan Shanahan, New Jersey Devils
Ray Sheppard, Buffalo Sabres
Kevin Stevens, Pittsburgh Penguins
Ron Tugnutt, Quebec Nordiques
Pierre Turgeon, Buffalo Sabres
Glen Wesley, Boston Bruins
Trent Yawney, Chicago Blackhawks
Scott Young, Hartford Whalers
Zarley Zalapski, Pittsburgh Penguins

Last games
The following is a list of players of note that played their last game in the NHL in 1987–88:
Bob Bourne, Los Angeles Kings
Richard Brodeur, Hartford Whalers
Clark Gillies, Buffalo Sabres
Doug Jarvis, Hartford Whalers
Pierre Larouche, New York Rangers
Dave Lewis, Detroit Red Wings
Gilles Meloche, Pittsburgh Penguins
Rick Middleton, Boston Bruins
Wilf Paiement, Pittsburgh Penguins (The last active player to have been a member of the Kansas City Scouts.)
Steve Payne, Minnesota North Stars
Denis Potvin, New York Islanders
Dave Semenko, Toronto Maple Leafs
Charlie Simmer, Pittsburgh Penguins
Brian Sutter, St. Louis Blues
Perry Turnbull, St. Louis Blues
Tiger Williams, Hartford Whalers

Firsts
Ron Hextall, Philadelphia Flyers, First goaltender in NHL history to shoot and score a goal.

Trading deadline
 Trading Deadline: March 8, 1988
March 8, 1988: Charlie Bourgeois and Hartford's third round choice in 1989 Entry Draft traded from St. Louis to Hartford for Hartford's second round choice in 1989 Entry Draft.
March 8, 1988: Geoff Courtnall, Bill Ranford and future considerations traded from Boston to Edmonton for Andy Moog.
March 8, 1988: Brian Curran traded from NY Islanders to Toronto for Toronto's sixth round choice in 1988 Entry Draft.
March 8, 1988: Moe Lemay traded from Edmonton to Boston for Alan May.
March 8, 1988: Jim Pavese traded from NY Rangers to Detroit for future considerations.
March 8, 1988: Gordie Roberts traded from Philadelphia to St. Louis for future considerations.
March 8, 1988: Steve Tsujuira traded from New Jersey to Boston for Boston's 10th round choice in 1988 Entry Draft (Alexander Semak).
March 8, 1988: Steve Weeks traded from Hartford to Vancouver for Richard Brodeur.

See also
List of Stanley Cup champions
1987 NHL Entry Draft
1987 NHL Supplemental Draft
39th National Hockey League All-Star Game
National Hockey League All-Star Game
NHL All-Rookie Team
Ice hockey at the 1988 Winter Olympics
1987 Canada Cup
1987 in sports
1988 in sports

References
 
 
 
 
Notes

External links
Hockey Database
NHL.com
SI Flashback to '88 Finals

 
1987–88 in Canadian ice hockey by league
1987–88 in American ice hockey by league